The Nichiryu Maru (Nitiryu Maru) was a 5,447 gross register ton cargo ship built by Asano Ship Building Company, Tsurumi in 1919 as Rozan Maru. She was the third ship of the Yoshida Maru No 1-class of 25 standard cargo ships (referred to as Type B at the time) built by Asano Shipyard (one was built at the Uraga Dock Company) between 1918 and 1919. In April 1929, she was acquired by Karafuto Kisen Kabushiki Kaisha and in 1931, renamed Karafuto Maru. On 22 November 1937, she was acquired by Nissan Kissen Kabushiki Kaisha and renamed Nichiryu Maru. She was requisitioned by the Imperial Japanese Army during World War II.

Fate
On 6 January 1943, while steaming as part of a convoy, carrying two companies of the 3rd Battalion, 102nd Infantry Regiment and medical supplies for the garrison at Lae, was hit by bombs from a Royal Australian Air Force PBY Catalina aircraft, and was sunk at 06°30'S, 149°00'E. Destroyers rescued 739 of the 1,100 troops on board, but the ship took with it 361 soldiers and all of Okabe's medical supplies.

Notes

External links
Chronological List of Japanese Merchant Vessel Losses

1919 ships
Ships of the Imperial Japanese Army
Ships sunk by Australian aircraft
Shipwrecks of Papua New Guinea
World War II shipwrecks in the Pacific Ocean
Maritime incidents in January 1943
Yoshida Maru No 1-class cargo ships